Sympherobius umbratus is a species of brown lacewing in the family Hemerobiidae. It is found in North America.

References

Further reading

 

Hemerobiiformia
Articles created by Qbugbot
Insects described in 1903